Horse of the Dog (stylized as Hörse Of the Dög) is the debut album by British rock band The Eighties Matchbox B-Line Disaster. It was released on 30 September 2002, on the No Death label in the UK.

The album was ranked 12th out of 20 by Kerrang! magazine as their Album of the Year in 2002.

On the 5th October 2022, in conjunction with the album marking it's 20 year anniversary, it was announced that a limited edition vinyl re-released was being produced to commemorate the band's release. Also included in the bundle is a second vinyl with all B-sides from the album's singles and liner notes from Edgar Wright, who directed the music video for Psychosis Safari.

Track listing
"Celebrate Your Mother" (McKnight & TEMBD) – 2.33
"Chicken" (Diamantopoulo & TEMBD) – 2.47
"Whack of Shit" (Huxley & TEMBD) – 2.18
"Psychosis Safari"  (Norris & TEMBD) – 2.52
"Giant Bones" (Huxley & TEMBD) – 1.46
"Fishfingers" (Diamantopoulo & TEMBD) – 2.07
"Charge the Guns" (Huxley & TEMBD) – 1.25
"Morning Has Broken"  (Huxley & TEMBD) – 2.33
"Team Meat" (Huxley & TEMBD) – 2.45
"Presidential Wave" (Huxley & TEMBD) – 4.06

B-sides
Amongst the list of B-sides below, live tracks, demo tracks and videos were also released on most of the singles from the album.

Personnel
Guy McKnight – vocals
Marc Norris – guitar
Andy Huxley – guitar
Sym Gharial – bass
Tom Diamantopoulo – drums
Paul Tipler – producer
Mat Willis – executive producer, management
Will Bartle – recording assistant
Jeremy Gill – mixing assistant
Ollie Dunn – mixing assistant
Phiesta – design
Leigh Anne Walter – photography

Singles

References

2002 debut albums
The Eighties Matchbox B-Line Disaster albums